Jakob Bjarnar Grétarsson (born 1962) is an Icelandic journalist, radio host, writer and musician. He was a member of the band Kátir piltar in the 1980s to the early 1990s. He is known for co-hosting the radio shows Górilla, Sleggjan and King Kong along with Davíð Þór Jónsson and Steinn Ármann Magnússon in the 1990s. He is currently a journalist at Vísir.is.

References

Living people
Jakob Bjarnar
Jakob Bjarnar
Jakob Bjarnar
Jakob Bjarnar
1962 births